Kilifi Uele (born November 14, 1974) is a Tongan footballer who plays as a midfielder for Veitongo and the Tonga national football team.

According to the RSSSF, Uele is the second oldest goalscorer in the history of international football.

International career
Uele made his debut internationally in 1994, with his team winning second place at the 1994 Polynesia Cup.  He went on to score three international goals, including one against New Caledonia in 2017 at the age of 43.  In January 2020, Uele, at the age of 45, represented Veitongo FC at the qualifying stage of the 2020 OFC Champions League.  Uele also plays beach soccer internationally, and was part of the Tongan team making its debut at the 2019 OFC Beach Soccer Nations Cup.

International goals
Scores and results list Tonga's goal tally first.

Managerial career
Uele is the Technical Director of the Tonga Football Association, a post he has held since 2005.  Uele coached his country's women's team to win a silver medal at the 2007 OFC Women's Championship.  Uele was also the head coach of his country's U-19 women's team when they took runner-up in the OFC U-19 Women's Championship in 2006, losing 6–0 to New Zealand in the finals.  Before the COVID-19 pandemic in 2020, Uele helped run a new project to promote women's football in the more remote islands of Tonga.  Later in 2020, Uele said his main focus was on the 2023 FIFA Women's World Cup.

References

Living people
1974 births
Tongan footballers
Tonga international footballers
Association football midfielders
Veitongo FC players
Women's national association football team managers